Stadio Vito Simone Veneziani is a multi-use stadium in Monopoli, Italy.  It is currently used mostly for football matches and is the home ground of  Monopoli.  The stadium holds 6,880 attendance.

References

Vito Simone Veneziani
A.C. Monopoli
Buildings and structures in the Province of Bari